Phanias is a genus of jumping spiders that was first described by Frederick Octavius Pickard-Cambridge in 1901. They are similar to members of Marpissa, but have three pairs of spines beneath the first tibia.

Species
 it contains eleven species, found only in Mexico, the United States, and El Salvador:
Phanias albeolus (Chamberlin & Ivie, 1941) – USA
Phanias concoloratus (Chamberlin & Gertsch, 1930) – USA
Phanias dominatus (Chamberlin & Ivie, 1941) – USA
Phanias flavostriatus F. O. Pickard-Cambridge, 1901 (type) – Mexico
Phanias furcifer (Gertsch, 1936) – USA
Phanias furcillatus (F. O. Pickard-Cambridge, 1901) – Mexico
Phanias harfordi (Peckham & Peckham, 1888) – USA
Phanias monticola (Banks, 1895) – USA
Phanias neomexicanus (Banks, 1901) – USA
Phanias salvadorensis Kraus, 1955 – El Salvador
Phanias watonus (Chamberlin & Ivie, 1941) – USA

References

External links
 Pictures of P. watonus

Salticidae genera
Salticidae
Spiders of North America
Taxa named by Frederick Octavius Pickard-Cambridge